Leandro de Almeida may refer to:
Leandro Almeida Silva (footballer born 1977) Brazilian footballer
Leandro Almeida Silva (footballer born 1987) Brazilian footballer
Leandro Marcolini Pedroso de Almeida (1982) Brazilian-Hungarian footballer